Ananda Dairy is a privately owned Indian dairy product manufacturer, based at Bulandshahr, in the state of Uttar Pradesh.

History
The company was set up by Indian businessman Dr. Radhey Shyam Dixit in 1989.

Initially, the name of the company was Gopaljee Dairy. In March 2012, they rebranded it to Gopaljee Ananda and started marketing themselves with the new name.

Presence
Ananda has over 5000 village and more than 2,00,000 dairy farmers from Uttar Pradesh, Haryana, and Punjab under its supply network.  The current production capacity of the company is 1,500,000 liters of milk a day, out of which they collect over an average of 8,00,000 liters of milk from dairy farmers. The company is in look out for a land to set up a new processing plant in eastern Uttar Pradesh and planned to invest approximately Rs 50 crore to open 1,100 retail outlets in Delhi by year 2020. Till March 2018,company achieved a turnover of Rs 1,500 crore, has three manufacturing plants at Bulandshahr, Gajraula and Pilkhuwa in Uttar Pradesh (UP) and together the plants has processing capacity of 12 lakh litre milk per day and in addition the company has also taken on lease two plants at Kanpur and Moradabad with 6 lakh litres capacity per day.

Ananda's authorized outlets are present at 20 locations across Delhi and the National Capital Region (NCR), Uttarakhand and Uttar Pradesh. In 2018 February, the company planned  at  opening 500 retail company-owned and company-operated outlets by end of March 2019 in states like Delhi-NCR, Haryana, Uttar Pradesh and Punjab. It operates over 200 outlets in the NCR and sells over 50 products at present and has presence in most of the dairy products, except ice creams with planned turnover of Rs 1,500 crore by March 2018. The company is also planning to strengthen its retail presence and has already opened 400 company-owned outlets, of which 400 stores are in the national capital and the rest are in UP and Uttarakhand.

Products
At present, Ananda offers a wide range of milk and milks products, including paneer (cottage cheese), ghee (clarified butter), rabri, dahi (yogurt), lassi, chaach(Buttermilk), flavored yogurt, flavored milk, honey drinks, whey drinks, butter, cookie, rusk, matthi, sweets, chips, khoya, dairy whitener, and dairy creamer. The company also manufactures non-dairy products, such as tea, corn flakes, boondi, sugar, and oats. In year 2018 it started exporting products and had shipped cheese and some other products to US.

In the news

Received India's 70 most trusted power brand in 2017.

Company received India's most trusted company award in 2017.

Received the 'Most Valuable Brands' award in "10th Power Brand Awards: India's Most Valuable Brands in 2017" held in Mumbai.

Ananda Dairy announced its first TV campaign in September 2017., which was conceptualized by its advertising and marketing partner, Bates CHI & Partners. This time company reveals New Brand Campaign "Anand Karo!”

Ananda tied up with Bates CHI & Partners for advertising in 2016.

In 2016, Ananda lined up singer Kailash Kher to create their corporate jingle. The company signed up Madison Media Group to handle its branding and promotion across India.

The dairy product firm came in news in 2015 due to quality concerns. Government labs in Lucknow and Kolkata conducted tests on Ananda's paneer samples and found that it did not meet the accepted quality standards. Later detailed investigation found them to be within the acceptable limits of the foods safety norms.

In 2015, Ananda received the Best Dairy Product Brand Award from the Minister of State for kumar, Government of India, Shripad Yesso Naik at an event at ICCR Auditorium, Azad Bhawan in IP Estate, New Delhi.

The brand also received an award under the “Make in UP” program from the then chief minister of Uttar Pradesh, Akhilesh Yadav, the central government minister Kalraj Mishra, and Indian Hockey player Dhanraj Pillay.

References

External links

Dairy products companies of India